Phyllocnistis temperatior is a moth of the family Gracillariidae, known from Java, Indonesia. The hostplant for the species is an unidentified species of  Leea.

References

Phyllocnistis
Endemic fauna of Indonesia